The Korean Provisional Government (KPG), formally the Provisional Government of the Republic of Korea, was a partially recognized Korean government-in-exile based in Shanghai, China, and later in Chongqing, during the period of Japanese colonial rule in Korea.

On 11 April 1919, a provisional constitution providing for a democratic republic named the "Republic of Korea" was enacted. It introduced a presidential system and three branches (legislative, administrative and judicial) of government. The KPG inherited the territory of the former Korean Empire. The Korean resistance movement actively supported the independence movement under the provisional government, and received economic and military support from the Kuomintang ("Chinese Nationalist Party"), the Soviet Union, and France.

After the surrender of Japan on 15 August 1945, figures such as Kim Gu returned. On 15 August 1948, the Provisional Government of the Republic of Korea was dissolved. Syngman Rhee, who was the first president of the Provisional Government of the Republic of Korea, became the first President of the Republic of Korea in 1948. The current South Korean government claims through the 1987-amended constitution of South Korea that there is continuity between the KPG and the current South Korean state, though this has been disputed.

The sites of the Provisional Government in Shanghai and Chongqing (Chungking) have been preserved as museums.

Background

The government was formed on 11 April 1919, shortly after the March 1st movement of the same year during the Imperial Japanese colonial rule of the Korean peninsula.

The Key members in its establishment included An Changho and Syngman Rhee, both of whom were leaders of the Korean National Association at that time. Changho played an important part in making Shanghai the center of the liberation movement and in getting KPG operations underway. As acting premier, he helped reorganize the government from a parliamentary cabinet system to a presidential system.

Military activities

The government resisted the colonial rule of Korea that lasted from 1910 to 1945. They coordinated armed resistance such as the Northern Military Administration Office Army, the Korean Independence Army, and the Korean Patriotic Organization against the Imperial Japanese Army during the 1920s and 1930s, including at the Battle of Bongoh Town in June 1920 and the Battle of Chingshanli in October 1920. However, ther manpower diminished when they attempted to reorganize their forces in Svobodny, Amur Oblast, Russia. The Bolsheviks believed them to be a liability to the Soviet Union during the Russian Civil War when the Japanese joined forces with the White Army and forced them disarm and join the Red Army. But they refused and the Red Army massacred them at Svobodny. Still, despite these losses, they hugely struck a blow to the Japanese military leadership in Shanghai's Hongkew Park, April 1932.

This struggle culminated in the formation of the Korean Volunteer Corps in 1938, the Joseon Volunteer Army, and the Korean Liberation Army in 1940, bringing together all Korean resistance groups in exile.

World War II

The government duly declared war against the Axis powers, Japan and Germany, on 9 December 1941, and the Liberation Army took part in allied action in China and parts of Southeast Asia. These efforts resulted in a guarantee from China, the United States, and the British in the Cairo Conference of a liberated Korea in the future, which was reaffirmed by the Soviets, the United States, and the British in the Potsdam Conference. The Soviets declared war on Japan and invaded northern Korea. The US then struck Hiroshima and Nagasaki which resulted in the surrender of Japan. The Soviets then began to strongly influence the parts of Korean they controlled.

During World War II, the Korean Liberation Army was preparing an assault against Japanese forces in Korea in conjunction with the US Office of Strategic Services. On 15 August 1945, the Japanese empire began to collapse and Korea finally gained independence a few weeks later, ending 35 years of Japanese occupation. This independence was reaffirmed in the Treaty of San Francisco. Thus, the Korean provisional government's goal of ending Japanese rule in Korea was ultimately achieved when the Japanese surrendered on 2 September 1945.

After the Liberation of Korea

After the end of World War II, the US and the Soviets stationed military forces in Korea. The Soviets occupied the northern half of the Korea, declaring war on Japan, and formed the Soviet Civil Administration after the end of World War II. Similarly, the US formed the United States Army Military Government in southern part of Korea.

The leading members of Korean Provisional Government disagreed the system of trusteeship applied to the Korean Peninsula.
Primarily, both sides of the political spectrum, with the left led by Centre-left politician Lyuh Woon-hyung and the right by Centre-right politician Kim Kyu-sik, disagreed with this system of trusteeship and resolved to cooperate despite having different opinions on governance.

However, the president of the US, Harry S. Truman declared the Truman Doctrine in March 1947. This doctrine accelerated what would be the Cold War and left long-lasting implications on the Korean Peninsula.

Formation

The Provisional Government of the Republic of Korea was founded in 1919 as part of the March 1st Movement. On 21 January 1919, rumors that Emperor Gojong was poisoned by the Japanese imperial family came to light. This culminated in a demonstration that took place at the Emperor's funeral on 1 March. Among the 20 million Koreans present, 3.1 million people participated in the demonstration, about 2.20 million, 10% of the total population. There were 7,500 deaths, 16,000 injured, and 46,000 arrested and detained. The protests, which began in March and continued until May, included 33 people who had signed the Declaration of Independence, but were in fact held by the Japanese police.

The independence movement's popularity grew quickly both locally and abroad. After the 1 March 1919, campaign, a plan was set up at home and abroad to continue expanding the independence movement. However, some were hesitant due to their obedience to the occupying powers. At that time, many independent activists were gathered in Shanghai. Those who set up independent temporary offices repeatedly discussed ways to find new breakthroughs in the independence movement. First, the theory of provisional government was developed, and it was generally argued that the government should organize a government in exile against the Chosun governor's office. However, it was argued that the party was not sufficiently equipped to form a government.

Shanghai was a transportation hub and also a center of support for the Guangdong government led by Wu Yuan. In addition, there were delegates from Britain, France, Germany, and the United States, which allowed them to escape the influence of Japan. For this reason, independent offices flocked to Shanghai.

Independence movements in Shanghai moved more aggressively in the summer of 1919. Seo Byeong-ho, Seung-hyung Cho, Dong-ho Cho, Park Chan-ik, and Sun Woo-hyuk met with the governments from Korea, Manchuria, the Russian Maritime Province and the Americas. Shanghai's independent offices provided accommodation for people from outside the country, centering on the French settlement, and organizing social gatherings for Koreans to create a close network. Around this time, the highly respected independent branch offices of Manchu and the Maritime provinces, such as Dongying, Lee, Shim, Kim DongSam, Shin Chae Ho, Cho Sung Hwan and Chaosang, came to Shanghai and were sent to Korea.

Paris Peace Conference

The Shinhan Youth Party wanted a promise of independence in Korea at the 1919 Paris Peace Conference and dispatched Kim Kyu-sik as a delegate. Since his childhood, he had been studying at the Underwood Academy, where he received a Western education in English, Latin, theology, mathematics, and science. He was multilingual able to speak English, French, German, Russian, Mongolian and Sanskrit as well as Korean, Chinese and Japanese. He delivered the Korean Independence petition to President Woodrow Wilson in the name of the Shinhan Youth Party, and went to Paris, France, in January 1919 to submit a petition in the name of the Provisional Government of the Republic of Korea. However, he was not allowed to attend the Peace Conference because the provisional government had not yet been established. Kim subsequently formed a provisional government to receive the credentials of officially representing the Korean government. Kim's trip to the conference became the motivation for the 1 March Movement and the establishment of the Provisional Government of the Republic of Korea.

Before his departure, Kim ordered the Shinhan Youth Party members to hold an independent demonstration, saying: "Even if sent to Paris, Westerners do not know who I am. To expose and propagate Japanese rule, one must declare independence in Korea. The person to be dispatched will be sacrificed, but what happens in Korea will fulfill my mission well."

Kim Kyu-sik communicated with the Shinhan Youth Party in Paris by radio, and they raised money for the lobbying effort. Inspired by Kim Kyu-sik's arguments, the Shinhan Young Youth Party sent people to Korea and met with national leaders such as Ham Tae-young and Cho Man-sik.  Kim Kyu-sik's order for independence demonstrations was the moment when the 1 March 1919 campaign began.

Participants at the time of the establishment of the Provisional Government of the Republic of Korea were Kim Kyu-sik, representative of the Shinhan Youth Group, Lyuh Woon-Hyung, Cho Seong Hwan (Minister of Defense), Kim Cheol, Sun Woo Hyuk, Han Jin Kyo, Chang Deok soo, Cho Dong Ho, Seo Byung Ho and Kim In Jon. There were 30 people including Nam Hyung Woo, Shin Ik-Hee, Yi Si-yeong, Yi Dong-nyeong, Cho Wan Gu, Sin Chaeho, Jo So-ang and Kim Dae Ji. In addition, Kim Gu, Yi Dong-nyeong participated in the establishment, and Ahn Changho, Yi Dong-hwi, and Syngman Rhee were appointed between April to September 1919 and entered Shanghai. Hwang Ki-hwan became the chief secretary of the Korea provisional government's French branch.

Korean Imperial Household attempt to join the KPG

Former empire personnel also participated in the establishment of the Provisional Government of the Republic of Korea. Kim Gajin, who served as an observer of Hwanghae Province and Chungcheongnam-do during the reign of the empire, was a high-ranking official who was defeated in 1910 by the Japanese after being deprived of his country. He formed a secret independent organization called Daedong Dan after the 1 March Movement began in 1919, and served as governor. He was exiled to the Provisional Government of the Republic of Korea in Shanghai, China in October 1919, and served as a provisional government adviser.

Kim Gajin, the fifth son of Emperor Gojong of the Korean Empire and one of the prime candidates for the prince, prepared a plan to escape to the Korean Provisional Government. The  Prince Imperial Uihwa sent a letter and indicated his intention to participate in the Provisional Government of the Republic of Korea. In November 1919, the  Prince Imperial Uihwa went to Andong, Manchuria, to escape to the provisional government in Shanghai, but was arrested after being apprehended by the Japanese army and forced to return home. The contents of the book, which was sent to the Provisional Government by the King, were published in an independent newspaper article on 20 November 1919. The current day of historians estimated the  Prince Imperial Uihwa had thought of the Korean independence movement and tried to join the Provisional Government of the Republic of Korea when he attended the Roanoke College in the US. The reason was  Prince Imperial Uihwa's colleague was Kim Kyu-sik and he had a relationship with Kim Kyu-sik in Roanoke College.

Establishment of the Provisional Council of the Republic of Korea

On 10 April 1919, 1,000 Chinese and Shinhan Youth Party people became the main actors in the "kimshinburo(Route Pere Robert)" a French tribe in Shanghai. On 11 April 1919, the National Assembly was established as the Republic of Korea, and the Republic of Korea adopted the Provisional Charter of the Republic of Korea as a democratic republic. After appointing Syngman Rhee as the prime minister in charge of the administration, he appointed six ministers, including Ahn Chang-ho to the ministry of internal affairs, Kim Kyu-sik to the ministry of foreign affairs, Yi Donghwi to the ministry of defense, Yi Si-yeong to the ministry of the law, Moon Chang-bum to the ministry of the traffic and Choi Jae-hyung to the ministry of finance. On 11 November, the government announced its establishment. On 22 April 1957 representatives of the 2nd Uijeongwon attended and representatives of the eight Korean provinces with representatives of Russia, China, and USA. The chairman was Yi Dongnyeong and vice-chairman was Sohn Jung-do elected in this time. The  had the same function as the National Assembly, such as the resolution of bills and the election of a temporary president.

Prior to this, on 17 March 1919, the Provisional Government of the Korean People's Congress was established in the Russian Maritime Province, followed by the establishment of the Hanseong Provisional Government in Kyungsung on 23 April. The Provisional Government of the Republic of Korea in Shanghai raised the issue of integration. Negotiations proceeded between the Korean National Assembly and the Provisional Government of the Republic of Korea. Won Sehun, who was selected as representative of the National Assembly of Korea, came to Shanghai and negotiated. Both argued that the center of the government should be placed in the area, but that only the departments of the subordinate should be placed on both sides. Despite the two arguments, they were eager to establish a single government as well. Finally, on 11 September 1919, the Korean National Assembly of the Russian Maritime Province and the Hanseong Provisional Government of Gyeongseong were incorporated into the Provisional Government of the Republic of Korea in Shanghai, China. As a result, the Provisional Government of the Republic of Korea was able to develop into a single unified government representing various independence movements scattered in Korea, China, and Russia, as well as domestic and foreign Koreans.

Representative contents of the Provisional charter of the Republic of Korea

Article 1, The Republic of Korea shall be a Democratic republic.

Article 2, The Republic of Korea shall be governed by the Provisional Government's resolution of the Provisional Council of the Republic of Korea.

Article 3, The people of the Republic of Korea have no class of men and women, no distinction, and no class of rich and poor, and are all equal.

Article 4, The people of the Republic of Korea enjoy the freedom of religion, press, authorship, publication, association, assembly, communication, address transfer, physical and ownership.

Article 5, Those qualified as citizens of the Republic of Korea shall have the right to vote and the right to the candidacy of eligibility for election.

Article 6, The people of the Republic of Korea have the obligation of education, tax payment, and military service.

Article 7, The Republic of Korea joins the League of Nations to exercise the spirit founded by the will of God to the world and further contribute to human culture and peace.

Article 8, The Republic of Korea gives preferential treatment to the former Korean Imperial Household.

Article 9, The abolition of the death penalty, corporal punishment, and prostitution system shall be made.

Article 10, The Provisional Government shall convene the National Assembly within one year after the restoration of the national territory.

Foreign relations

In 1919, when US President Woodrow Wilson advocated for national self-determination, Rhee promoted the League of Nations mandate in the United States, and Kim Kyu-sik pushed for independence under the approval of a victorious country in Paris. The provisional government gained approval from China and Poland through its diplomatic efforts. Meanwhile, in 1944, the government received approval from the Soviet Union. Jo So-ang, the head of the KPG's diplomatic department, met with the French ambassador in Chongqing and was quoted as saying that the French government would give unofficial approval to the government in April 1945. However, the government did not gain formal recognition from the US, UK, and other world powers. In 2019, the US Congress adopted a specific resolution that stated the Provisional Government of the Republic of Korea was essential to the success of Korean democracy.

Transition of power
The Korean government in exile was established to lead the independence movement on the Korean Peninsula against colonial rule. It was established on 11 April 1919, in Shanghai, China. On 11 September of the same year, it established a single government in Shanghai by integrating temporary governments such as those of Seoul and Russia's Maritime Province.

The Provisional Constitution was enacted to form the Republic of Korea as a democratic republic. It introduced the presidential system and established separate legislative, administrative and judicial branches. It succeeded the territory of the Korean Empire. Interim president Rhee was impeached and succeeded by Kim Gu. Under the Provisional Government of the Republic of Korea, he actively supported the independence movement, including the organization of the Korean Liberation Army, and received economic and military support from the Chinese Nationalists, the Soviet Union, France, the United Kingdom and the United States.

After the liberation on 15 August 1945, temporary government factors such as Kim Gu returned to Korea. On 15 August 1948, the Korean exile government and the KPG were dissolved. Rhee, who was the first president of the Provisional Government of the Republic of Korea, became the first President of the Republic of Korea in 1948. The current South Korean government through the national constitution revised in 1987 states that the South Korean people inherited the rule of the Provisional Government of the Republic of Korea, though this has been criticized by some historians as constituting revisionism.

Celebration
On Thursday, 11 April 2019, the Government of South Korea celebrated the 100th anniversary of build the Provisional Government of the Republic of Korea in Yeouido Park. This time President of South Korea Moon Jae-in visited the United States. In this celebration Liberation Association's peoples read the "Provisional charter of the Republic of Korea". South Korean actor Kang Ha-neul read the storytelling style about the Dream of Provisional Government of the Republic of Korea's peoples and member of K-pop boy band Shinee and South Korean actor Onew performed the military musical titled Shinheung Military Academy.

List of presidents

Prime ministers and presidents
 Syngman Rhee (11 September 1919 – 21 March 1925) – Impeached by the provisional assembly
 Yi Dongnyeong (16 June 1924 – 11 December 1924) – Acting
 Park Eun-sik (11 December 1924 – 24 March 1925) – Acting
 Park Eun-sik (24 March 1925 – September 1925)

Presidents of the Governance and State Council Directory
  (September 1925) – Acting
 Yi Sang-ryong (September 1925 – January 1926)
 Yang Gi-tak (January 1926 – 29 April 1926)
 Yi Dongnyeong (29 April – 3 May 1926)
 Ahn Chang-ho (3 – 16 May 1926)
 Yi Dong-nyeong (16 May – 7 July 1926)
 Hong Jin (7 July – 14 December 1926)
 Kim Koo (14 December 1926 – August 1927)

Chairmen of the State Council
 Yi Dongnyeong (August 1927 – 24 June 1933)
  (24 June 1933 – October 1933)
 Yi Dongnyeong (October 1933 – 13 March 1940) – Died in office
 Kim Koo (1940 – March 1947)
 Syngman Rhee (March 1947 – 15 August 1948) – Became the first President of South Korea (24 July 1948 – 26 April 1960)

Gallery

See also 
History of South Korea
Korean independence movements
Korean Liberation Army
Cairo Conference
Potsdam Conference
Overrun Countries series
Memorial Day
Three Principles of the Equality

References

Further reading
Korea Times article "Provisional Government in Shanghai Resisted Colonial Rule" by Robert Neff
Korea's Provisional Government established in 1919 in Shanghai – Arirang News

External links 

 
1919 in Korea
Korea, Republic of
Korean independence movement
Political history of Korea
Korea, Republic of
Republicanism in Korea
States and territories established in 1919
States and territories disestablished in 1948
1919 establishments in Korea
1948 disestablishments in Korea